This is a complete list of German Type XXI submarines. Fifteen hundred boats of this design were intended (U-2501 to U-4000), the first five hundred ordered from Deutsche Werft at Hamburg, another five hundred from AG Weser at Bremen, and a final five hundred from Schichau at Danzig, but only those listed below were completed, and most that did never saw service and were scuttled.

References

Type XXI submarines